The women's foil was one of eight fencing events on the fencing at the 1976 Summer Olympics programme. It was the twelfth appearance of the event. The competition was held from 23 to 24 July 1976. 48 fencers from 20 nations competed.

Competition format

The 1976 tournament returned to a mix of pool and knockout rounds similar to that used in 1968, after the 1972 edition briefly used a pool-only format. The competition included three pool rounds, followed by a double-elimination knockout round, finishing with a final pool round. In each pool round, the fencers competed in a round-robin.

Bouts in the round-robin pools were to 5 touches; bouts in the double-elimination round were to 8 touches. Repechages were not used in the first three rounds, but were used to determine medalists if necessary in the final.

Results

Round 1

Round 1 Pool A

Round 1 Pool B

Round 1 Pool C

Round 1 Pool D

Round 1 Pool E

Round 1 Pool F

Round 1 Pool G

Round 1 Pool H

Round 1 Pool I

Round 2

Round 2 Pool A

Round 2 Pool B

Round 2 Pool C

Round 2 Pool D

Round 2 Pool E

Round 2 Pool F

Round 3

Round 3 Pool A

Round 3 Pool B

Round 3 Pool C

Round 3 Pool D

Double elimination rounds

Winners brackets

Winners group 1

Winners group 2

Winners group 3

Winners group 4

Losers brackets

Losers group 1

Losers group 2

Final round 

The top two fencers tied at 4–1, requiring a barrage for the gold and silver medals. 

 Barrage

Final classification

References

Foil women
1976 in women's fencing
Fen